The dog sense of smell is the most powerful sense of this species, the olfactory system of canines being much more complex and developed than that of humans. Dogs have roughly forty times more smell-sensitive receptors than humans, ranging from about 125 million to nearly 300 million in some dog breeds, such as bloodhounds. This is thought to make its sense of smell up to 40 times more sensitive than human's. These receptors are spread over an area about the size of a pocket handkerchief (compared to 5 million over an area the size of a postage stamp for humans).  Dogs' sense of smell also includes the use of the vomeronasal organ, which is used primarily for social interactions.

The dog has mobile nostrils that help it determine the direction of the scent. Unlike humans, dogs do not need to fill up their lungs as they continuously bring odors into their noses in bursts of 3-7 sniffs. The dog noses have a bony structure inside that humans do not have, which allows the air that has been sniffed to pass over a bony shelf to which odor molecules adhere. The air above this shelf is not washed out when the dog breathes normally, so the scent molecules accumulate in the nasal chambers and the scent builds with intensity, allowing the dog to detect the faintest of odors and can even detect emotions.

One study into the learning ability of dogs compared to wolves indicated that dogs have a better sense of smell than wolves when locating hidden food, but there has yet been no experimental data to support this view.

The wet nose, or rhinarium, is essential for determining the direction of the air current containing the smell. Cold receptors in the skin are sensitive to the cooling of the skin by evaporation of the moisture by air currents.

See also 

Scent hound
Sighthound
Dog anatomy

References 

Scent hounds
Hunting
Hunting with hounds
Dog shows and showing